The Polska Grupa Zbrojeniowa (PGZ SA) is a holding company established by the Polish government to unite Polish state owned defence industry companies. The headquarters of this group is in Radom.

The Group comprises over 30 companies (including Rosomak SA,  Huta Stalowa Wola SA, Jelcz Sp. z o.o., Ośrodek Badawczo-Rozwojowy Centrum Techniki Morskiej SA, Wojskowe Zakłady Elektroniczne SA, Wojskowe Zakłady Inżynieryjne SA, Wojskowe Zakłady Motoryzacyjne SA, Wojskowe Zakłady Łączności Nr 1 SA, Wojskowe Zakłady Łączności Nr 2 SA, the Central Military Bureau of Design, Wojskowe Zakłady Lotnicze Nr 1 SA, Wojskowe Zakłady Lotnicze Nr 2 SA, Wojskowe Zakłady Lotnicze Nr 4 SA i Wojskowe Zakłady Uzbrojenia SA, WSK PZL Kalisz SA, Fabryka Broni Łucznik Radom SA, Nano Carbon SA)
. Polska Grupa Zbrojeniowa SA is the biggest Polish defence enterprise.

Central Military Bureau of Design and Technology
Wojskowe Centralne Biuro Konstrukcyjno-Technologiczne SA (WCBKT SA)  (en. Central Military Bureau of Design and Technology ) is a joint stock company formed on the basis of state owned company, established in 1980 by the Polish Ministry of National Defence.

Company specialises in the designing and manufacturing of aircraft ground support equipment as well as simulators and armament training devices for tank and infantry fighting vehicle crews.

Central Military Bureau of Design and Technology as a state enterprise was established on 1 January 1980.

The main objective of the Central Military Bureau of Design and Technology Joint Stock Company is manufacturing aircraft ground support equipment as well as training equipment, service and design.

WCBKT SA is included in Polska Grupa Zbrojeniowa SA.

References

Defence companies of Poland
Government-owned companies of Poland
Polish brands